Emeric Tușa (born 23 September 1941) is a Romanian rower. He competed in the men's coxless four event at the 1972 Summer Olympics.

References

External links
 

1941 births
Living people
Romanian male rowers
Olympic rowers of Romania
Rowers at the 1972 Summer Olympics
People from Covasna County